WRKM (1350 AM, "AM 1350 SportsMap Radio") is a radio station broadcasting a Sports format. Licensed to Carthage, Tennessee, United States, the station is currently owned by Wood Broadcasting, Inc. and features programming from SportsMap.

References

External links

RKM
Sports radio stations in the United States
Smith County, Tennessee